Anders Karlsen (born 15 February 1990) is a Norwegian football midfielder how plays for Innstranden.

Career
Karlsen join the first team in 2006 after impressing in the second team. In 2009, he went on loan to Stavanger.

Before the 2012-season he signed a contract with Mjøndalen, but he went back to Bodø/Glimt in 2013.

Career statistics

References

1990 births
Living people
Sportspeople from Bodø
Norwegian footballers
FK Bodø/Glimt players
Stavanger IF players
Mjøndalen IF players
Norwegian First Division players
Eliteserien players

Association football midfielders